Huỳnh Châu (born 25 October 1960) is a Vietnamese former cyclist. He competed in the road race at the 1988 Summer Olympics.

References

External links
 

1960 births
Living people
Vietnamese male cyclists
Olympic cyclists of Vietnam
Cyclists at the 1988 Summer Olympics
Place of birth missing (living people)